Misselbrook is an English surname and may refer to:

 Henry Misselbrook (1832–1895), an English cricketer
 Misselbrook and Weston, an English convenience store chain since taken over by Tesco; see Brighton Hill